Cacodyl, also known as dicacodyl or tetramethyldiarsine, (CH3)2As–As(CH3)2, is an organoarsenic compound that constitutes a major part of "Cadet's fuming liquid" (named after the French chemist Louis Claude Cadet de Gassicourt). It is a poisonous oily liquid with an extremely unpleasant garlicky odor. Cacodyl undergoes spontaneous combustion in dry air.

Cacodyl is also the name of the functional group or radical (CH3)2As.

Preparation

A mixture of dicacodyl and cacodyl oxide ((CH3)2As–O–As(CH3)2) was first prepared by Cadet by the reaction of potassium acetate with arsenic trioxide. A subsequent reduction yields a mixture of several methylated arsenic compounds including dicacodyl.

The global reaction (mass balance) corresponding to the oxide formation is the following:

 

A more efficient synthesis was later developed which started from the dimethyl arsine chloride and dimethyl arsine:

History

Robert Wilhelm Bunsen coined the name kakodyl (later modified to cacodyl in English) for the dimethylarsinyl radical, (CH3)2As, from the Greek κακώδης kakōdēs ("evil-smelling") and ὕλη hylē ("matter").

It was investigated by Edward Frankland and (for over six years) by Robert Bunsen and is considered the earliest organometallic compound ever discovered (even though arsenic is not a true metal).

From it other compounds were made, such as cacodyl fluoride, cacodyl chloride, et cetera. One compound, cacodyl cyanide, was particularly awful. In Bunsen's words "the smell of this body produces instantaneous tingling of the hands and feet, and even giddiness and insensibility...It is remarkable that when one is exposed to the smell of these compounds the tongue becomes covered with a black coating, even when no further evil effects are noticeable". 

Work on cacodyl led Bunsen to the postulation of "methyl radicals" as part of the then-current radical theory.

Applications

Cacodyl was used to try to prove the radical theory of Jöns Jacob Berzelius, which resulted in a wide use of cacodyl in research laboratories. Afterward interest in the toxic, malodorous compound decreased. During World War I the use of cacodyl as a chemical weapon was considered, but it was never used in the war. Inorganic chemists discovered the properties of cacodyl as a ligand for transition metals.

See also
 Cacodylic acid
 Dimethyl(trifluoromethylthio)arsine
 Lewisite
 Trimethylarsine
 Cacodyl cyanide
 Cacodyl oxide

References

 
Foul-smelling chemicals